Miluyeh (also Romanized as Mīlūyeh) is a village in Arad Rural District, Arad District, Gerash County, Fars Province, Iran. At the 2016 census, its population was 97, in 31 families.

References 

Populated places in Gerash County